Odds and Ends may refer to:

 "Odds and Ends" (song), a 1969 song by Dionne Warwick
 Odds & Ends (album), a 1995 collection of unfinished tracks and demo recordings by Dido

See also 
 To the Stars... Demos, Odds and Ends, a 2015 album by Tom DeLonge